Patricia E. Skinner, FRHistS (born 1965) is a British historian and academic, specialising in Medieval Europe. She was until August 2020 Professor of History at Swansea University. She was previously Reader in Medieval History at the University of Winchester and Lecturer in Humanities at the University of Southampton. She has published extensively on the social history of southern Italy and health and medicine. With Dr Emily Cock, she started the project "Effaced from History: Facial Difference and its Impact from Antiquity to the Present Day" to study the history of facial disfigurement.

Skinner received her PhD in Medieval History from the University of Birmingham in 1990. Her thesis on the Duchy of Gaeta was published in 1995 as Family Power in Southern Italy. In 1997, she was elected a Fellow of the Royal Historical Society (FRHistS). She has been co-editor of Social History of Medicine since 2014, and a member of the council of the Royal Historical Society since 2015.

Selected works
As author
  
 
 
  

As editor

References

1965 births
Living people
British medievalists
Women medievalists
British women historians
Academics of the University of Winchester
Academics of Swansea University
Academics of the University of Southampton
Fellows of the Royal Historical Society
20th-century British historians
21st-century British historians
British medical historians
21st-century British women writers
20th-century British women writers